Scythris timoi is a moth of the family Scythrididae. It was described by Kari Nupponen in 2009. It is found in Uzbekistan. The habitat consists of riverside woods, surrounded by desert steppes.

Etymology
The species is dedicated to Timo Nupponen, the brother of the author.

References

timoi
Moths described in 2009
Moths of Asia